The Rural Municipality of Harris No. 316 is a rural municipality (RM) in the Canadian province of Saskatchewan within Census Division No. 12 and  Division No. 5.

History 
The RM of Harris No. 316 incorporated as a rural municipality on December 12, 1910.

Geography

Communities and localities 
The following urban municipalities are surrounded by the RM.

Villages
 Harris
 Tessier

The following unincorporated communities are within the RM.

Localities
 Brisbin
 Crystal Beach

Demographics 

Attractions 
 Leonard Farm Museum
 Crystal Beach Regional Park
 Crystal Beach Lake Prairie National Wildlife Area
 Prairie National Wildlife Area
 Harris Heritage Museum

Government 
The RM of Harris No. 316 is governed by an elected municipal council and an appointed administrator that meets on the second Wednesday of every month. The reeve of the RM is David Husband while its administrator is Adrienne Urban. The RM's office is located in Harris.

Transportation 
 Saskatchewan Highway 7
 Saskatchewan Highway 655
 Saskatchewan Highway 768
 Canadian National Railway

See also 
List of rural municipalities in Saskatchewan

References 

H